Pan-African Socialist Party (PSP) was a Togolese political party advocating socialism and pan-Africanism. It was founded in the early 1990s in response to Togo's legalization of opposition parties. After the assassination of its first and brightest leader, Tavio Amorin, in July 1992, the party fell into obscurity. The Togolese police were responsible for the killing.

African socialist political parties
Defunct political parties in Togo
Defunct socialist parties
Pan-Africanism in Togo
Pan-Africanist political parties in Africa
Socialism in Togo
Socialist parties in Africa